The 2000–2001 Vendée Globe is a non-stop solo Round the World Yacht Race for IMOCA 50 and IMOCA 60 class yachts. This is the fourth edition of the race starting on the 9th November 2000 from Les Sables-d'Olonne.

Summary
The departure originally planned for Sunday, November 5 but the decision was made to delay the postponed start till Thursday, 9 November 2000 a delay of 4 days due to bad weather.

This race was the first major test of the new safety rules, introduced following the tragedies the previous races. Overall, it was a success; although some boats were again forced to retire from the race, none were lost. This race also featured the youngest entrant ever: Ellen MacArthur, who at 24 years old managed to put together a serious campaign with her custom-built boat Kingfisher.

Yves Parlier was the first to establish a lead, and headlines were made by Dominique Wavre of Switzerland on 10 December 2000 when his 430 nautical miles broke the 24-hour record for distance sailed single-handed. Parlier was soon under attack by Michel Desjoyeaux, who then moved into the lead. Parlier dismasted while pushing to catch up and lost contact with race organizers, resulting in MacArthur's being diverted to provide assistance. MacArthur resumed racing when contact with Parlier was restored, and managed to maintain fourth place.

By the mid-Atlantic she had caught up, and while negotiating the calms and variable winds of the Doldrums, the two traded the lead position several times.

MacArthur's chance to win was lost when she struck a semi-submerged container and was forced to make repairs. Desjoyeaux and PRB, flying the French flag, would go on to win the race at 93d 3h 57', with MacArthur and Kingfisher under the flag of Great Britain finishing second at 94d 4h 25', and Roland Jourdain and Sill Matines La potagère, also under French flag, finishing third at 96d 1h 2'. MacArthur pulled in to a rapturous reception, as "the youngest ever competitor to finish, the fastest woman around the planet—and only the second solo sailor to get around the globe in less than 100 days." Parlier, meanwhile, had anchored off New Zealand, and managed to fabricate by himself a new carbon-fibre mast from his broken one, and continuing racing, gained an official place.

Incidents

Retirement causes

Other incidents

Results

Entries

Participants gallery

Participant facts equipment
Twenty skippers started the race a qualification passage was required to validate the registration of each boat, this course could have been carried out as part of another sailing race.

References

External links
 
 Official You Tube Channel
 

Vendée Globe
Vendée Globe
Vendée Globe
Vendée Globe
Vendée Globe
 
Vendee